No-cost campaign is a term coined initially by a Stanford student. It refers to a political campaign in which the candidates run without funding. Based on a foundation and the principles of Web 2.0 networking, the original essay analyzes the potential of social networking site Digg.com. Because Web 2.0 follows the democratic principle of being powered by the masses, it is a well-suited medium for political campaigning, and could save hundreds of millions of dollars in campaign money.

External links
Original essay in blog format

Political campaigns